Talon may refer to the following people

Antoine Omer Talon (1760–1811), French counter-revolutionary
Durwin Talon, Canadian illustrator 
Jean Talon (1626–1694), the first intendant of New France
Nicolas Talon (1605–1691), French Jesuit, historian, and ascetical writer
Patrice Talon (born 1958), Beninese businessman and politician
Pierre Talon (1676–?), French-Canadian explorer
Zoé Talon, comtesse du Cayla (1785–1852), an intimate friend of Louis XVIII of France

See also
 Tallon (disambiguation)